The Norfolk Island national rugby league team (or the Pine Trees) is the representative side of Norfolk Island in rugby league football. The Pine Trees are classified as an "observer nation" by the Rugby League International Federation, having been inactive from international competition since 1992 due to a lack of eligible players. As a result, rugby league on Norfolk Island only exists as a junior sport, with the hopes of returning to international competition in the future.

1992 Pacific Cup
Norfolk Island participated in the 1992 Pacific Cup as members of the second pool, pitting them against the New Zealand Māori team, Australian Aborigines, American Samoa, and Tokelau. However, Norfolk Island failed to win a single game in the tournament, scoring 20 points in their 4 games, while conceding 296 points.

1992 Pacific Cup squad - Shaun Goudie (c), Matthew Reeves (vc), Terry Jope, Brendan Christian, Brent Singer, Brendon Cook, Jason Richards, Dylan Menzies, Peter Yager, Jeff Singer, Mickey Sanders, Darren Nicolai, George Nebauer, Kerry Nicholson, Shane Schmitz, John Adams, Ian Kiernan, Paul Dodds, Darren Trickey, Hayden Evans, Brendan King, Brian Buffett, Edan Mackie, Neil Christian and Brentt Jones. Mal Snell (coach), Paul Christian (liaison office) and John Moochie Christian (first aid).

Results

Pacific Cup

Sources
 Rugby League Gazette March/April 2003

See also

Sport in Norfolk Island
Rugby league in Australia

References

External links

National rugby league teams
Rugby league representative teams in Australia
Sport in Norfolk Island
Rugby football in Norfolk Island
National sports teams of Norfolk Island